Glossopteridales is an extinct order of plants belonging to Pteridospermatophyta, or seed ferns, also known as Arberiales and Ottokariales. They arose at the beginning of the Permian on the southern continent of Gondwana. The majority or all members of the group became extinct at the end of the Permian period, during the Permian-Triassic extinction event; a possible Middle Triassic member of the group was described in 2022. The best known genus is Glossopteris, a leaf form genus. Other examples are Gangamopteris  Glossotheca and Vertebraria.

Permian permineralised glossopterid reproduction organs found in the central Transantarctic Mountains suggest seeds had an adaxial attachment to the leaf-like mega-sporophyll.  This indicate Glossopteridales can be classified as seed ferns and is important in determining the status of the group as either close relatives or ancestors of the angiosperms.

Midrib-less forms were common in the Early Permian whereas midrib forms were more common in the Late Permian.

See also
Glossophyte

References
 Notes

 Sources

External links 
  Glossipteridales

Pteridospermatophyta
Prehistoric plant orders
Permian plants
Triassic plants
Cisuralian first appearances
Permian extinctions